The 2016 Fast5 Netball World Series is the seventh staging of the annual Fast5 Netball World Series, and the fourth to be played under the new Fast5 rules, which replaced the older fastnet rules introduced in 2009. The tournament was held in Australia for the first time with the venue being at Hisense Arena in Melbourne.

The 2016 tournament is being contested by the six top national netball teams in 2016.

Overview

Date and Venue
The 2016 Fast5 Netball World Series was played in Melbourne, Australia over two days, from 29–30 October. All matches were held at Hisense Arena, which has a capacity of 10,500.

Format
18 matches were played over two days, under the Fast5 rules of netball. Each team played each other once during the first two days in a round-robin format. The two highest-scoring teams from this stage progressed to the Grand Final while the remaining teams contested the third-fourth place playoff match and fifth-sixth place playoff match.

Teams
The tournament is being contested by the six top national netball teams in the world, according to the INF World Rankings:

Draw and results

Standings
1. Australia (5 wins, 0 losses, 0 draws)

2. New Zealand (4 wins, 1 losses, 0 draws)

3. England (2 wins, 2 losses, 1 draws)

4. Malawi (2 wins, 3 losses, 0 draws)

5. Jamaica (1 wins, 4 losses, 0 draws)

6. South Africa (0 wins, 4 losses, 1 draws)

Final Placings

|

References

http://fast5worldseries.com.au

2016
2016 in netball
International netball competitions hosted by Australia
2016 in Australian netball
2016 in New Zealand netball
2016 in English netball
2016 in South African women's sport
2016 in Malawian sport
2016 in Jamaican sport
Netball in Victoria (Australia)